Murtizapur railway station serves Murtizapur in Akola district in the Indian state of Maharashtra. The – narrow-gauge line, popular as Shakuntala Railway, meets the electrified  broad gauge Howrah–Nagpur–Mumbai line at Murtizapur.

History
The first train in India travelled from Mumbai to Thane on 16 April 1853. By May 1854, Great Indian Peninsula Railway's Bombay–Thane line was extended to Kalyan.  Bhusawal railway station was set up in 1860 and in 1867 the GIPR branch line was extended to Nagpur.

The -long  Achalpur–Murtazapur–Yavatmal   narrow-gauge railway, locally known as the Shakuntala Railway, was  built by a British firm, Killik Nixon & Company, in 1903.

Electrification
The railways in the – sector were electrified in 1989–90.

References

Railway stations in Akola district
Railway junction stations in Maharashtra
Bhusawal railway division
Railway stations opened in 1867